The 41st Annual Grammy Awards were held on February 24, 1999, at Shrine Auditorium, Los Angeles. They recognized accomplishments by musicians from the year 1998. Lauryn Hill received the most nominations with 10, setting a record for the most nominations for female artist in one night. Hill received a total of 5 awards, and became the first female rapper to take home Best New Artist. Her album The Miseducation of Lauryn Hill became the first hip hop album to win the award for Album of the Year.

Songwriters James Horner and Will Jennings won Song of the Year for Celine Dion's "My Heart Will Go On". Dion herself took home Record of the Year for the latter song. The ceremony was known as the "Grammy Year of Women", because every artist nominated for Album of the Year was female (including Garbage, with Shirley Manson as the lead singer).

Madonna won three awards and opened the show with her performance of "Nothing Really Matters". While musicians the Dixie Chicks, Vince Gill, Alanis Morissette, Stevie Wonder and Shania Twain won two apiece.
It is widely remembered for Ricky Martin's performance of "La Copa De La Vida"/ "The Cup of Life".

Performers 
 Celine Dion & Andrea Bocelli - The Prayer
 Madonna - Nothing Really Matters
 Shania Twain - Man! I Feel Like A Woman
 Eric Clapton & B. B. King - Rock Me Baby
 Sheryl Crow - There Goes The Neighborhood
 Aerosmith - I Don't Want To Miss A Thing
 Vince Gill - If You Ever Have Forever In Mind
 Alanis Morissette - Uninvited
 Luciano Pavarotti - Nessun Dorma
 Kirk Franklin with Bono, Mary J. Blige, Gerald Levert & Crystal Lewis - Lean On Me
 Ricky Martin - La Copa de la Vida/The Cup of Life
 Lauryn Hill & Carlos Santana - To Zion

Presenters 
 Jennifer Lopez & Jerry Seinfeld - Best Pop Vocal Album
 Foxy Brown, Chris Tucker & Missy Elliot - Best Rap Solo Performance
 Eric Clapton & B.B. King - Best New Artist
 Backstreet Boys & Martina McBride - Best Country Album
 Brandy & Monica - Best Spoken Comedy Album
 Shirley Manson & Billy Corgan - Best Female Rock Vocal Performance
 Dixie Chicks & Brian Setzer - Best Male Country Vocal Performance
 Faith Hill & Clint Black - Best Rock Album
 Jimmy Smits & Gloria Estefan - Best Latin Pop Performance
 Will Smith & Jada Pinkett-Smith - Song of the Year
 Puff Daddy, Beck & Sarah McLachlan - Record of the Year
 Sting & Whitney Houston - Album of the Year

Award winners

General
Record of the Year
 "My Heart Will Go On" – Celine Dion
 Walter Afanasieff, Simon Franglen & James Horner, producers; Simon Franglen, Humberto Gatica & David Gleeson, engineers/mixers
 "The Boy Is Mine" – Brandy & Monica
 Dallas Austin, Brandy & Rodney Jerkins, producers; Leslie Brathwalte, Ben Garrison, Rodney Jerkins & Dexter Simmons, engineers/mixers
 "Iris" – Goo Goo Dolls
 Rob Cavallo & Goo Goo Dolls, producers; Jack Joseph Puig & Allen Sides, engineers/mixers
 "Ray Of Light" – Madonna
 Madonna & William Orbit, producers; Pat McCarthy, engineer/mixer
 "You're Still The One" – Shania Twain
 Robert John "Mutt" Lange, producer; Jeff Balding & Mike Shipley, engineers/mixers

Album of the Year
 The Miseducation of Lauryn Hill – Lauryn Hill
 Lauryn Hill, producer; Commissioner Gordon, Matt Howe, Storm Jefferson, Ken Johnston, Tony Prendatt, Warren Riker, Chris Theis & Johnny Wyndrx, engineers/mixers
 The Globe Sessions – Sheryl Crow
 Sheryl Crow, producer; Tchad Blake, Trina Shoemaker & Andy Wallace, engineers/mixers
 Version 2.0 – Garbage
 Garbage, producers; Billy Bush, engineer/mixer
 Ray Of Light – Madonna
 Marius De Vries, Patrick Leonard, Madonna & William Orbit, producers; Jon Englesby, Pat McCarthy & David Reitzas, engineers/mixers
 Come On Over – Shania Twain
 Robert John "Mutt" Lange, producer; Jeff Balding & Mike Shipley, engineers/mixers

Song of the Year
 "My Heart Will Go On"
 James Horner and Will Jennings, songwriters (Celine Dion)
 "I Don't Want To Miss A Thing"
 Diane Warren, songwriter (Aerosmith)
 "Iris"
 John Rzeznik, songwriter (Goo Goo Dolls)
 "Lean On Me"
 Kirk Franklin, songwriter (Kirk Franklin with Mary J. Blige, R. Kelly, Bono, Crystal Lewis & The Family)
 "You're Still The One"
 Robert John "Mutt" Lange & Shania Twain, songwriters (Shania Twain)

Best New Artist
Lauryn Hill
 Backstreet Boys
 Andrea Bocelli
 Dixie Chicks
 Natalie Imbruglia

Alternative
Best Alternative Music Performance
 Hello Nasty – Beastie Boys
 From the Choirgirl Hotel – Tori Amos
 Is This Desire? – PJ Harvey
 Airbag / How Am I Driving? – Radiohead
 Adore – The Smashing Pumpkins

Blues
 Best Traditional Blues Album
 Otis Rush for Any Place I'm Going
 Best Contemporary Blues Album
 Keb' Mo' for Slow Down

Children's
 Best Musical Album for Children
 John Boylan (producer) for Elmopalooza! performed by the Sesame Street cast with various artists
 Best Spoken Word Album for Children
 Dan Musselman and Stefan Rudnicki (producers) for The Children's Shakespeare performed by various artists

Comedy
From 1994 through 2003, see "Best Spoken Comedy Album" under the "Spoken" field, below.

Classical
Best Orchestral Performance
Pierre Boulez (conductor) & the Chicago Symphony Orchestra for Mahler: Symphony No. 9 
Best Classical Vocal Performance
Jeffrey Tate (conductor), Renée Fleming & the English Chamber Orchestra for The Beautiful Voice (Works of Charpentier, Gounod etc.)
Best Opera Recording
Pierre Boulez (conductor), Jessye Norman, László Polgár & the Chicago Symphony Orchestra for Bartók: Bluebeard's Castle
Best Choral Performance
Robert Shaw (conductor) & the Atlanta Symphony Orchestra & Chorus for Barber: Prayers of Kierkegaard/Vaughan Williams: Dona Nobis Pacem/Bartók: Cantata Profana
Best Instrumental Soloist(s) Performance (with orchestra)
Krzysztof Penderecki (conductor), Anne-Sophie Mutter & the London Symphony Orchestra for Penderecki: Violin Concerto No. 2, Metamorphosen
Best Instrumental Soloist Performance (without orchestra)
Murray Perahia for Bach: English Suites Nos. 1, 3 And 6 
Best Small Ensemble Performance (with or without conductor)
Steve Reich (conductor) for Reich: Music for 18 Musicians performed by Steve Reich and Musicians
Best Chamber Music Performance
André Previn & Gil Shaham for American Scenes (Works of Copland, Previn, Barber, Gershwin) 
Best Classical Contemporary Composition
Krzysztof Penderecki (composer & conductor), Anne-Sophie Mutter & the London Symphony Orchestra for Penderecki: Violin Concerto No. 2, Metamorphosen
Best Classical Album
James Mallinson (producer), Robert Shaw (conductor) & the Atlanta Symphony Orchestra & Chorus for Barber: Prayers of Kierkegaard/Vaughan Williams: Dona Nobis Pacem/Bartók: Cantata Profana
Best Classical Crossover Album
Jorge Calandrelli (conductor) & Yo-Yo Ma for Soul of the Tango - The Music of Ástor Piazzolla

Composing and arranging
Best Instrumental Composition
Future Man & Victor Lemonte Wooten (composers) for "Almost 12" performed by Bela Fleck & the Flecktones
Best Song Written for a Motion Picture or for Television
James Horner & Will Jennings (songwriters) for "My Heart Will Go On" (from Titanic) performed by Céline Dion
Best Instrumental Composition Written for a Motion Picture or for Television
John Williams (composer) for Saving Private Ryan
Best Instrumental Arrangement
Don Sebesky (arranger) for "Waltz for Debby"
Best Instrumental Arrangement Accompanying Vocal(s)
Herbie Hancock, Robert Sadin & Stevie Wonder (arrangers) for "St. Louis Blues" performed by Herbie Hancock

Country
Best Female Country Vocal Performance
Shania Twain for "You're Still the One"
Best Male Country Vocal Performance
Vince Gill for "If You Ever Have Forever in Mind"
Best Country Performance by a Duo or Group with Vocal
Dixie Chicks for "There's Your Trouble"
Best Country Collaboration with Vocals
Clint Black, Joe Diffie, Merle Haggard, Emmylou Harris, Alison Krauss, Patty Loveless, Earl Scruggs, Ricky Skaggs, Marty Stuart, Pam Tillis, Randy Travis, Travis Tritt & Dwight Yoakam for "Same Old Train"
Best Country Instrumental Performance
Vince Gill & Randy Scruggs for "A Soldier's Joy"
Best Country Song
Robert John "Mutt" Lange & Shania Twain (songwriters) for "You're Still the One" performed by Shania Twain
Best Country Album
Blake Chancey, Paul Worley (producers), John Guess (engineer/mixer) & Dixie Chicks for Wide Open Spaces 
Best Bluegrass Album
Ricky Skaggs & Kentucky Thunder for Bluegrass Rules!

Folk
Best Traditional Folk Album
The Chieftains for Long Journey Home 
Best Contemporary Folk Album
Lucinda Williams for Car Wheels on a Gravel Road

Gospel
Best Pop/Contemporary Gospel Album
Deniece Williams for This Is My Song
Best Rock Gospel Album
Ashley Cleveland for You Are There
Best Traditional Soul Gospel Album
Cissy Houston for He Leadeth Me
Best Contemporary Soul Gospel Album
Kirk Franklin for The Nu Nation Project
Best Southern, Country or Bluegrass Gospel Album
Peter Afterman, John Huie & Ken Levitan (producers) for The Apostle - Music From and Inspired by the Motion Picture performed by various artists
Best Gospel Choir or Chorus Album
O'landa Draper (choir director) for Reflections performed by O'Landa Draper & The Associates Choir

Historical
Best Historical Album
Colin Escott, Kira Florita, Kyle Young (producers), Joseph M. Palmaccio & Tom Ruff (engineers) for The Complete Hank Williams

Jazz
Best Jazz Instrumental Solo
Gary Burton & Chick Corea for "Rhumbata"
Best Jazz Instrumental Performance, Individual or Group
Herbie Hancock for Gershwin's World
Best Large Jazz Ensemble Performance
Grover Mitchell (director) for Count Plays Duke performed by the Count Basie Orchestra
Best Jazz Vocal Performance
Shirley Horn for I Remember Miles
Best Contemporary Jazz Performance
Pat Metheny Group for Imaginary Day
Best Latin Jazz Performance
Arturo Sandoval for Hot House

Latin
 Best Latin Pop Performance
 Ricky Martin for Vuelve
 Best Tropical Latin Performance
 Marc Anthony for Contra La Corriente
 Best Mexican-American Music Performance
 Los Super Seven for Los Super Seven
 Best Latin Rock/Alternative Performance
 Maná for Sueños Líquidos
 Best Tejano Music Performance
 Flaco Jiménez for Said and Done

Musical show
Best Musical Show Album
Mark Mancina (producer) & the original Broadway cast for The Lion King

Music video
Best Short Form Music Video
Jonas Åkerlund (video director) & Madonna for "Ray of Light"
Best Long Form Music Video
Susan Lacy, Tamar Hacker (video producers), Timothy Greenfield-Sanders (video producer & director) & Lou Reed for American Masters - Lou Reed: Rock and Roll Heart

New Age
Best New Age Album
Clannad for Landmarks

Packaging and notes
Best Recording Package
Kevin Reagan (art director) for Ray of Light performed by Madonna
Best Boxed Recording Package
Jim Kemp & Virginia Team (art director) for The Complete Hank Williams performed by Hank Williams
Best Album Notes
Bob Belden, Michael Cuscuna & Todd Coolman (notes writers) for Miles Davis Quintet 1965-1968 performed by the Miles Davis Quintet

Polka
Best Polka Album
Jimmy Sturr for Dance With Me performed by Jimmy Sturr & His Orchestra

Pop
Best Female Pop Vocal Performance
Celine Dion for "My Heart Will Go On"
Best Male Pop Vocal Performance
Eric Clapton for "My Father's Eyes"
Best Pop Performance by a Duo or Group with Vocal
The Brian Setzer Orchestra for "Jump Jive an' Wail"
Best Pop Collaboration with Vocals
Burt Bacharach & Elvis Costello for "I Still Have That Other Girl"
Best Pop Instrumental Performance
The Brian Setzer Orchestra for "Sleepwalk"
Best Dance Recording
Pat McCarthy (mixer), William Orbit (producer) & Madonna (producer & artist) for "Ray of Light"
Best Pop Album
David Reitzas, Jon Ingoldsby & Pat McCarthy (engineers/mixers), William Orbit (producer) & Madonna (producer & artist) for Ray of Light

Production and engineering
Best Engineered Album, Non-Classical
Andy Wallace, Tchad Blake & Trina Shoemaker (engineers) for The Globe Sessions performed by Sheryl Crow
Best Engineered Album, Classical
Jack Renner (engineer), Robert Shaw (conductor) & the Atlanta Symphony Orchestra & Chorus for Barber:Prayers of Kierkegaard/Vaughan Williams: Dona Nobis Pacem/Bartók: Cantata Profana
Producer of the Year, Non-Classical
Rob Cavallo
Producer of the Year, Classical
Steven Epstein
Remixer of the Year, Non-Classical
David Morales

R&B
Best Female R&B Vocal Performance
 "Doo Wop (That Thing)" – Lauryn Hill
 "Are You That Somebody?" – Aaliyah
 "Tyrone" – Erykah Badu
 "A Rose Is Still a Rose" – Aretha Franklin
 "I Get Lonely" – Janet Jackson

Best Male R&B Vocal Performance
 "St. Louis Blues" – Stevie Wonder in Herbie Hancock's Gershwin's World
 "Matrimony: Maybe You" – Maxwell
 "The Only One for Me" – Brian McKnight
 "My Way" – Usher
 "I Know" – Luther Vandross

Best R&B Performance by a Duo or Group with Vocal
 "The Boy Is Mine" – Brandy & Monica
 "Lean on Me" – Kirk Franklin with Mary J. Blige, R. Kelly, Bono, Crystal Lewis & The Family
 "Nothing Even Matters" – Lauryn Hill & D'Angelo
 "All My Life" – K-Ci & JoJo
 "Stay" – The Temptations

Best R&B Song
 "Doo Wop (That Thing)"
 Lauryn Hill, songwriter (Lauryn Hill)
 "All My Life"
 Rory Bennett & JoJo Hailey, songwriters (K-Ci & JoJo)
 "The Boy Is Mine"
 Brandy, LaShawn Daniels, Fred Jerkins III, Rodney Jerkins & Japhe Tejeda, songwriters (Brandy & Monica)
 "Lean on Me"
 Kirk Franklin, songwriter (Kirk Franklin with Mary J. Blige, R. Kelly, Bono, Crystal Lewis & The Family)
 "A Rose Is Still a Rose"
 Lauryn Hill, songwriter (Aretha Franklin)

Best R&B Album
 The Miseducation of Lauryn Hill – Lauryn Hill; Lauryn Hill, producer; Commissioner Gordon & Tony Prendatt, engineers/mixers
 Live – Erykah Badu; Erykah Badu & Norman "Keys" Hurt, producers; Norman "Keys" Hurt, Gordon Mack & Kenny Ortiz, engineers/mixers
 Never Say Never – Brandy; Rodney Jerkins, producer; Brad Gilderman & Rodney Jerkins, engineers/mixers
 A Rose Is Still a Rose – Aretha Franklin
 Embrya – Maxwell; Musze, producer; Musze & Mike Pela, engineers/mixers

Best Traditional R&B Vocal Album
 Live! One Night Only – Patti LaBelle
 Believe in Me – Regina Belle
 To Make Me Who I Am – Aaron Neville
 Phoenix Rising – The Temptations
 I Know – Luther Vandross

Rap
Best Rap Solo Performance
 "Gettin' Jiggy Wit It" – Will Smith
 "Dangerous" – Busta Rhymes
 "Lost Ones" – Lauryn Hill
 "Hard Knock Life" – Jay-Z
 "Gone Till November" – Wyclef Jean

Best Rap Performance by a Duo or Group
 "Intergalactic" – Beastie Boys
 "Money Ain't A Thang" – Jermaine Dupri featuring Jay-Z
 "Deja Vu (Uptown Baby)" – Lord Tariq & Peter Gunz
 "Rosa Parks" – OutKast
 "Ghetto Supastar" – Pras Michel featuring Ol' Dirty Bastard and Mýa

Best Rap Album
 Vol. 2... Hard Knock Life – Jay-Z
 Capital Punishment – Big Punisher
 Life In 1472 - The Original Soundtrack – Jermaine Dupri
 Harlem World – Mase
 The Love Movement – A Tribe Called Quest

Reggae
Best Reggae Album
Sly and Robbie for Friends

Rock
Best Female Rock Vocal Performance 
Alanis Morissette for "Uninvited"
Best Male Rock Vocal Performance
Lenny Kravitz for "Fly Away"
Best Rock Performance by a Duo or Group with Vocal
Aerosmith for "Pink"
Best Rock Instrumental Performance
Pat Metheny Group for "The Roots of Coincidence"
Best Hard Rock Performance
Jimmy Page & Robert Plant for "Most High"
Best Metal Performance
Metallica for "Better Than You"
Best Rock Song
Alanis Morissette (songwriter) for "Uninvited"
Best Rock Album
Tchad Blake, Trina Shoemaker (engineers/mixers) & Sheryl Crow (producer & artist) for The Globe Sessions

Spoken
Best Spoken Word Album
Christopher Reeve for Still Me
Best Spoken Comedy Album
Mel Brooks & Carl Reiner for The 2000 Year Old Man in the Year 2000

Traditional pop
Best Traditional Pop Vocal Performance
Patti Page for Live at Carnegie Hall: The 50th Anniversary Concert

World
 Best World Music Album
 Gilberto Gil for Quanta Live

Special merit awards

MusiCares Person of the Year
Stevie Wonder

Grammy Legend Award
Elton John

References

 041
1999 in California
1999 music awards
1999 in Los Angeles
1999 in American music
February 1999 events in the United States
1999 awards in the United States